49,XXXXY syndrome is an extremely rare aneuploidic sex chromosomal abnormality. It occurs in approximately 1 out of 85,000 to 100,000 males. This syndrome is the result of maternal non-disjunction during both meiosis I and II. It was first diagnosed in 1960 and was coined Fraccaro syndrome after the researcher.

Signs and symptoms
The symptoms of 49,XXXXY are slightly similar to those of Klinefelter syndrome and 48,XXXY, but they are usually much more severe. Aneuploidy is often fatal, but there is "X-inactivation", where the effect of the additional gene dosage due to the presence of extra X chromosomes is greatly reduced.

Reproductive 
Those with 49,XXXXY syndrome tend to exhibit infantile secondary sex characteristics with sterility in adulthood.
 Hypoplastic genitalia

Physical 
Males with 49,XXXXY tend to have numerous skeletal anomalies. These skeletal anomalies include:
 Genu valgum
 Pes cavus
 Fifth finger clinodactyly

The effects also include:

Cognitive and developmental 
Much like Down syndrome, the mental effects of 49,XXXXY syndrome vary. Impaired speech and maladaptive behavioral problems are typical.  One study looked at males that were diagnosed with 48,XXYY, 48,XXXY and 49,XXXXY. They found that males with 48,XXXY and 49,XXXXY function at a much lower cognitive level than males their age. These males also tend to exhibit more immature behavior for their chronological age; increased aggressive tendencies were also cited in this study.

Pathophysiology
As its name indicates, a person with the syndrome has one Y chromosome and four X chromosomes on the 23rd pair, thus having forty-nine chromosomes rather than the normal forty-six. As with most categories of aneuploidy disorders, 49,XXXXY syndrome is often accompanied by intellectual disability. It can be considered a form or variant of Klinefelter syndrome (47,XXY). Individuals with this syndrome are typically mosaic, being 49,XXXXY/48, XXXX.

It is genetic but not hereditary, meaning that while the genes of the parents cause the syndrome, there is a small chance of more than one child having the syndrome. The probability of inheriting the disease is about one percent.

Diagnosis
49,XXXXY can be clinically diagnosed through karyotyping. Facial dysmorphia and other somatic abnormalities may be reason to have the genetic testing done.

Treatment 
While there is no treatment to correct the genetic abnormality of this syndrome, there is the potential to treat the symptoms. As a result of infertility, one man from Iran used artificial reproductive methods. An infant in Iran diagnosed with 49,XXXXY syndrome was born with patent ductus arteriosus, which was corrected with surgery, and other complications that were managed with replacement therapy.

See also 
 Aneuploidy
 Turner syndrome
 Klinefelter syndrome
 49, XXXXX, a similar syndrome that affects females

References

Further reading

External links 

 49 XXXXY at the National Organization of Rare Diseases

Sex chromosome aneuploidies
Chromosomal abnormalities
Rare syndromes
intersex variations